Edenbridge Town railway station is one of two stations serving Edenbridge in Kent, England.

Facilities
The station has a ticket office which is staffed during Monday-Saturday mornings (06:30-13:05 Mon-Fri, 07:00-13:30 Sat). At other times, the station is unstaffed and tickets can be purchased from the self-service ticket machine at the station.

The station has passenger help points and covered seating areas available on both platforms which are linked by a subway. There are also toilets at the station which are open when the station is staffed. The station has a free car park (operated by Saba Parking) and taxi-rank at its main entrance. There is also a cycle rack at the station entrance.

The London-bound platform is accessible without steps, but the Uckfield-bound platform can be reached only by the stepped subway and so is not accessible.

Bus Connections
The station is served by the following bus services:
 Metrobus routes 231 & 233 to Penshurst and Tunbridge Wells (Monday-Saturday)
 Southdown PSV route 236 to Oxted, Westerham and East Grinstead (Monday-Friday)
 Go-Coach route E1 in a circular route around Edenbridge (Monday-Friday)

Services 

All services at Edenbridge Town are operated by Southern using  DMUs.

The typical off-peak service in trains per hour is:
 1 tph to  via 
 1 tph to 
 
Services increase to 2 tph in each direction during the peak hours.
 
On Sundays, the northbound service runs as far as Oxted only.

See also 
Edenbridge railway station, the other station in the town

References

External links

Edenbridge, Kent
Railway stations in Kent
Former London, Brighton and South Coast Railway stations
Railway stations in Great Britain opened in 1888
Railway stations served by Govia Thameslink Railway